Steve Gotsche (born August 24, 1961) is an American professional golfer who played on the PGA Tour and the Nationwide Tour.

Gotsche joined the PGA Tour in 1994, earning his Tour card through qualifying school. In his rookie year he recorded the best PGA Tour finish of his career, a fifth-place finish at the New England Classic. He didn't play well enough to retain his Tour card but earned his card through qualifying school for the second time. After an unsuccessful year on Tour, he joined the Nationwide Tour in 1996. He only played in three events from 1997 to 1998 but rejoined the Tour in 1999. That was his breakthrough year on Tour, winning the Nike Monterrey Open and the Nike Upstate Classic en route to a 15th-place finish on the money list, good enough for a PGA Tour card for 2000. In his return to the PGA Tour he didn't play well enough to retain his card. He played on the Nationwide Tour in 2001 and 2002.

Amateur wins
1984 Kansas Amateur

Professional wins (8)

Nike Tour wins (2)

*Note: The 1999 Nike Upstate Classic was shortened to 54 holes due to weather.

Other wins (6)
1988 Wyoming Open
1990 PGA Assistant Professional Championship, Kansas Open
1998 Nebraska Open
2008 Midwest PGA Championship
2018 Senior Midwest PGA Championship

Results in major championships

CUT = missed the half-way cut
"T" = Tied
Note: Gotsche only played in the U.S. Open.

See also
1993 PGA Tour Qualifying School graduates
1994 PGA Tour Qualifying School graduates
1999 Nike Tour graduates

External links

American male golfers
Nebraska Cornhuskers men's golfers
PGA Tour golfers
Junior college men's golfers in the United States
Korn Ferry Tour graduates
Golfers from Kansas
Barton Community College alumni
People from WaKeeney, Kansas
People from Great Bend, Kansas
1961 births
Living people